The Namur Gate was one of the medieval city gates of the second walls of Brussels, Belgium. In the 21st century, Namur Gate denotes the Ixelles neighbourhood where the gate formerly stood, rather than the former gate itself. This area is served by Porte de Namur/Naamsepoort metro station on lines 2 and 6 of the Brussels Metro.

History
The city gate was originally known as New Gate of Coudenberg, to distinguish it from the old gate located in the first walls, and it used to connect the / (current /) to the / (current /).

During the construction of the boulevards of the small ring, two neoclassical former toll pavilions were raised there by the architect Auguste Payen (collaborator of Nicolas Roget, the architect of the City of Brussels) in 1836. Tolling was abolished in 1860, and the buildings were moved to the entrance of the Bois de la Cambre/Ter Kamerenbos three years later. Removing barriers then permitted the Namur Gate area to develop.

In 1866, the pavilions were replaced by the monumental Brouckère fountain, which was raised in memory of the former mayor of the City of Brussels, Charles de Brouckère, designed by the architect Henri Beyaert and by the two sculptors Pierre Dunion and Edouard Fiers. The monument was dismantled in 1955 to allow the rearrangement of boulevards in preparation for the 1958 Brussels World's Fair (Expo '58).

The "Namur Gate" district
The name Namur Gate ended up designating the whole of the Ixelles neighbourdhood, which at the beginning of the 20th century, became one of the most popular places in Brussels' upper town, a meeting place for the wealthy class and artists. The district back then had many cafés, chic restaurants, luxury shops, performance halls, and later, cinemas.

The modernisation of the road infrastructure in the second half of the 20th century marked the end of this period by transforming the district into a place of transit for cars. The /, which linked the boulevards to the /, was removed and replaced by an office tower, the Bastion Tower, and several neoclassical buildings also disappeared. Performance halls were transformed into department stores or fast food outlets.

Nowadays, the Namur Gate area is once again becoming a busy commercial centre, less elitist than in the past, and one of the liveliest districts in the city. It merges in part with the so-called Matongé district, a meeting place for African communities in Brussels.

See also

 History of Brussels
 Belgium in "the long nineteenth century"

References

Footnotes

Notes

Brussels
Gates in Belgium
City of Brussels